My Dear Lisa is a 2022 Indian Tamil horror thriller film written and directed by Ranjan Krishnadevan. It stars Vijay Vasanth, Chandini Tamilarasan and Aadukalam Naren in the lead roles. The film released in 2022 after a few years delay.

Cast

Production
The film began production in March 2016 following a launch event held at a hotel in Chennai, with an expected release date set of mid-2016. Vijay Vasanth and Riyaz Khan were revealed to be in the cast, while actors Swaminathan and Mayilswamy, along with a host of comedy actors from Vijay TV were selected for roles. The film has a similar title to the 1987 film of the same name.

In late 2016, actress Leesha was selected to play the titular role and worked on the film simultaneously alongside six other films, even before her first release. Leesha was later replaced by Chandini Tamilarasan.

The film was shot in Ooty and by October 2016, the film was reported to be "eighty percent" finished. The shoot continued in June 2018, with production halted after Vijay Vasanth broke his leg. The film proved to be the actor's final film before he moved into full-time politics.

Release
Several years after the completion of the film, it had a limited theatrical release across Tamil Nadu on 5 August 2022. A critic from Thanthi TV gave the film a negative review, criticising the screenplay.

References

External links

2022 films
2020s Tamil-language films
Films shot in Ooty
Indian thriller films